Alex Malinga (born 1974) is an Ugandan marathon runner. He was born in Kapchorwa.

He finished sixth at the 2005 World Championships, in a national record of 2:12:12 hours.

He also competed at the 2000 Olympic Games, finishing in 57th place. At the 2007 World Championships he finished twelfth.

Achievements
All results regarding marathon, unless stated otherwise

External links

1974 births
Living people
Ugandan male long-distance runners
Ugandan male marathon runners
Athletes (track and field) at the 2000 Summer Olympics
Athletes (track and field) at the 2008 Summer Olympics
Olympic athletes of Uganda